"Helping Hand" is a song by Australian rock band The Screaming Jets. The song was released in December 1993 as the fourth single from the second studio album Tear of Thought (1992).  The song peaked at number 25 on the ARIA charts.

In January 2018, as part of Triple M's "Ozzest 100", the 'most Australian' songs of all time, "Helping Hand" was ranked number 56.

The music video was filmed at Battersea Power Station, London, UK in 2012 on their first-ever UK tour.

Track listings
 CD Single (rooArt 4509941542)
 "Helping Hand" - 4:50	
 "High Voltage" - 7:22	
 "Shine On" - 8:12

Charts

Weekly charts

Year-end charts

References

1992 songs
1993 singles
The Screaming Jets songs